Olearia hygrophila, commonly known as swamp daisy or water daisy, is a species of flowering plant in the family Asteraceae and is endemic to a restricted part of North Stradbroke Island in south-eastern Queensland. It is a shrub with slender stems, linear leaves and white and yellow, daisy-like inflorescences.

Description

Taxonomy
This species was first formally described in 1836 by Augustin Pyramus de Candolle who gave it the name Eurybia hygrophila in his Prodromus Systematis Naturalis Regni Vegetabilis, from specimens collected by Allan Cunningham on North Stradbroke Island. In 1867, George Bentham changed the name to Olearia hygrophila in Flora Australiensis. The specific epithet (hygrophila) means "moisture-loving".

Distribution and habitat
Olearia hygrophila grows in swamps and is restricted to the north-east end of North Stradbroke Island in south-eastern Queensland.

Conservation status
This daisy bush is classified as "endangered" under the Australian Government Environment Protection and Biodiversity Conservation Act 1999 and the Queensland Government Nature Conservation Act 1992. The main threats to the species include weed invasion, inappropriate fire regimes land clearing and changes in hydrology.

References

hygrophila
Flora of Queensland
Plants described in 1836
Taxa named by Augustin Pyramus de Candolle